Jang Hee-sun (born 31 May 1986) is a South Korean field hockey player. She competed for the South Korea women's national field hockey team at the 2016 Summer Olympics.

References

External links

1986 births
Living people
South Korean female field hockey players
Olympic field hockey players of South Korea
Field hockey players at the 2016 Summer Olympics
Field hockey players at the 2018 Asian Games
Asian Games competitors for South Korea
21st-century South Korean women